WYBO (92.9 FM) is a radio station broadcasting a rhythmic oldies format licensed to Waynesboro, Georgia, and serving the Augusta metropolitan area. The station is currently owned by John Smith, and signed on in March 2016.

Programming
The station currently programs a format consisting of classic soul and beach music.

References

External links

YBO
Radio stations established in 2016
Rhythmic oldies radio stations in the United States